Panchkanya is a Rural Municipality  and formed by merging 5 Village development committee i.e. Chaughada, Kabilash, Panchakanya, Thaprek and Bhadrutar in Nuwakot District in Bagmati Province of central Nepal.  Panchakanya has total 5 wards, which are scattered across 53 square kilometers of geographical area. According to 2011 census Nepal Census conducted by Central Bureau of Statistics (CBS), Panchakanya Rural Municipality had total population of 15,945.

References

External links
UN map of the municipalities of Nuwakot District

Populated places in Nuwakot District
Rural municipalities in Nuwakot District
Rural municipalities of Nepal established in 2017